Ballymagorry or Ballymagory (Irish: Baile Mhic Gofraidh (MacGorry's townland)) is a small village and townland in County Tyrone, Northern Ireland. In the 2001 Census it had a population of 565. It lies within the Strabane District Council area and lies on the River Glenmornan.

History 
The village is known as Bellymagarry in Ulster-Scots.

Transport
The area was once served by rail with Ballymagorry railway station run by the County Donegal Railway on the section from Strabane (CDR) railway station to Londonderry Victoria Road in Derry line. Ballymagorry station opened on 7 August 1900 but was shut on 1 January 1955.  The village lies on the main A5 trunk road between Strabane and 'Derry.

Demography

19th century population
The population of the village decreased during the 19th century:

21st century population
Ballymagorry is classified as a small village. On Census day (29 April 2001) there were 565 people living in Ballymagorry. Of these:
25.3% were aged under 16 years and 15.2% were aged 60 and over
50.4% of the population were male and 49.6% were female
43.7% were from a Catholic background and 54.0% were from a Protestant background
4.8% of people aged 16–74 were unemployed

Ballymagorry Townland
The townland is situated in the historic barony of Strabane Lower and the civil parish of Leckpatrick and covers an area of 289 acres.

The population of the townland increased slightly during the 19th century:

Sport
Ballymagorry is home to Fox Lodge Cricket Club.

See also
List of townlands of County Tyrone

References

External links
Ballymagorry Rent Rolls

Villages in County Tyrone
Townlands of County Tyrone
Barony of Strabane Lower